Alexander Fröschl (born 15 July 1992) is an Austrian footballer. He previously played in the Austrian Bundesliga for Wacker Innsbruck.

References

Austrian footballers
Austrian Football Bundesliga players
FC Wacker Innsbruck (2002) players
First Vienna FC players
1992 births
Living people
Association football forwards